Peter Maher may refer to:

Peter Maher (runner) (born 1960), marathon runner
Peter Maher (boxer) (1869–1940), bare-knuckle boxer
Peter Maher (sportscaster) (born 1949), former radio announcer for the Calgary Flames of the National Hockey League
Peter Maher (hurler) (1872–1947), Irish sportsperson